Alexander Edward Young (born September 9, 1993) is an American professional baseball pitcher in the Cincinnati Reds organization. He played college baseball for Texas Christian University (TCU), and was drafted by the Arizona Diamondbacks in the second round of the 2015 MLB draft. He made his MLB debut in 2019 with the Diamondbacks, and has also played in Major League Baseball (MLB) for the Cleveland Indians / Guardians and San Francisco Giants.

Amateur career
Young attended Carmel High School in Mundelein, Illinois. As a senior he was 7-1 and in 41 innings allowed 13 hits while striking out 71 batters, and was named a 2012 Louisville Slugger first-team All-American and the conference Player of the Year. He was drafted by the Texas Rangers in the 32nd round of the 2012 Major League Baseball draft, but did not sign. 

He attended Texas Christian University (TCU) to play college baseball. In 2014, he played collegiate summer baseball with the Falmouth Commodores of the Cape Cod Baseball League, was 3-0 with a 1.50 ERA, and was named a league all-star. After his junior year, when he was 9-3 with a 2.22 ERA in 97.1 innings, he was drafted by the Arizona Diamondbacks in the second round of the 2015 MLB draft.

Professional career

Arizona Diamondbacks
Young signed with the Diamondbacks and made his professional debut with the Arizona League Diamondbacks, and after one scoreless appearance, he was promoted to the Hillsboro Hops where he finished the season, posting a 1.50 ERA in six innings. In 2016, Young played for both the Kane County Cougars and Visalia Rawhide, pitching to a combined 5-8 record, 3.56 ERA and 1.31 WHIP in 21 games (20 starts) between both teams. 

He spent 2017 with the Jackson Generals where he went 9-9 with a 3.68 ERA in 27 games (24 starts). He split 2018 with Jackson and the Reno Aces, pitching to a combined 10-5 record with a 5.17 ERA in 29 games (21 starts) between both teams. 

He opened the 2019 season back with Reno. 

On June 27, 2019, the Diamondbacks selected Young's contract and promoted him to the major leagues. He made his debut that night, pitching five innings and recording the win versus the San Francisco Giants.

On July 7, Young pitched a no-hitter through 6 innings of play vs. the Colorado Rockies at that time he was lifted by Arizona manager Torey Lovullo. Torey said he wanted to protect Young with a limited pitch count, and this decision was met with a chorus of boos from the hometown fans. The D-backs still held on to win the game 5-3. On August 2, Young collected his first MLB hit, remarkably the Diamondbacks' sole hit in a 3–0 home loss to the Nationals. Young pitched the first six innings, giving up two runs on three hits and striking out nine. 

He ended the 2019 season with a record of 7–5 with an ERA of 3.56 in  innings, in 17 games (15 starts). His fastball velocity (87.6 mph) was in the slowest 3% in major league baseball.

In 2020, Young began the season pitching out of the bullpen before being placed in the starting rotation. In 15 games (7 starts), he finished with an ERA of 5.44 in  innings. 

In 2021, after struggling to a 2-6 record and 6.26 ERA in 30 appearances (2 starts) with the Diamondbacks, Young was designated for assignment by Arizona on July 21.

Cleveland Indians / Guardians
On July 26, 2021, Young was claimed off of waivers by the Cleveland Indians.

Young was designated for assignment by the newly-named Cleveland Guardians on November 19, 2021. After clearing waivers, he was outrighted to the Triple-A Columbus Clippers on November 24.

The Guardians selected Young's contract on July 3, 2022. With AAA Columbus in 2022, he had been 3-0 with one save and a 3.66 ERA in 30 relief appearances, as in 32 innings he struck out 47 batters. With the Guardians in 2022, he pitched a scoreless third of an inning, with one hit and one strikeouts. He was designated for assignment on July 14.

In 2022 to that point, he had thrown mostly an 83 mph slider, a 91 mph sinker, and an 85 mph changeup, with an occasional fourseam fastball, curveball, and cutter.

San Francisco Giants
On July 18, 2022, the Guardians traded Young to the San Francisco Giants in exchange for cash considerations.

In 2022, after pitching three scoreless innings for AAA Sacramento, he pitched for the Giants.  He was 1-1 with a 2.39 ERA over 24 games (one start) covering 26.1 innings. On November 18, he was non tendered and became a free agent.

Cincinnati Reds
On January 17, 2023, Young signed a minor league deal with the Cincinnati Reds that included an invitation to spring training.

References

External links

TCU Horned Frogs bio

Living people
1993 births
People from Hawthorn Woods, Illinois
Baseball players from Illinois
Major League Baseball pitchers
Arizona Diamondbacks players
Cleveland Indians players
Cleveland Guardians players
San Francisco Giants players
TCU Horned Frogs baseball players
Arizona League Diamondbacks players
Hillsboro Hops players
Kane County Cougars players
Visalia Rawhide players
Jackson Generals (Southern League) players
Reno Aces players
Falmouth Commodores players
Lakeshore Chinooks players